Governor Darling may refer to:

Charles Henry Darling (1809–1870), 3rd Governor of Victoria from 1863 to 1866
Clifford Darling (1922–2011), 4th Governor-General of the Bahamas from 1992 to 1995
Henry Darling (1780–1845), Lieutenant Governor of Tobago from 1833 to 1845
Ralph Darling, (1772–1858), Governor of New South Wales from 1825 to 1831